The 2004 Belgian Cup Final, took place on 17 May 2004 between Beveren and Club Brugge. It was the 49th Belgian Cup final and was won by Club Brugge.

Route to the final

Match

Details

External links
  

Belgian Cup finals
Cup Final
Belgian Cup final 2004